Starotavlarovo (İśke Tawlar) is a rural locality (a selo) and the administrative centre of Tavlarovsky Selsoviet, Buzdyaksky District, Bashkortostan, Russia. The population was 737 in 2010. There are nine streets.

Geography 
Starotavlarovo is located 37 km north of Buzdyak (the district's administrative centre) by road. Kubyak is the nearest rural locality.

References 

Rural localities in Buzdyaksky District